This is a list of members of the Tasmanian Legislative Council from 2002 to 2006. Terms of the Legislative Council do not coincide with Legislative Assembly elections, with members serving eight-year terms, and two or three members facing re-election every year. The members have been categorised here according to the four-year terms of the Legislative Assembly so as to avoid the need for separate member lists for each year.

1 Independent Rosevears MLC Ray Bailey retired in 2002 at the conclusion of his term. He was replaced by another independent, Kerry Finch, at the periodic election.
2 The two incumbents facing re-election, Paul Harriss (Huon) and Sue Smith (Montgomery) were both returned.
3 Mersey MLC Geoff Squibb, Windermere MLC Silvia Smith and Derwent MLC Michael Aird faced re-election at the 2003 periodic elections. Squibb, an independent, was defeated by another independent, Norma Jamieson. Smith, an independent Labor member, was defeated by conservative independent Ivan Dean. Aird, a Labor member, was comfortably returned.
4 Aspley MLC Colin Rattray and Elwick MLC David Crean both retired at the 2004 periodic elections. Rattray's daughter Tania Rattray, like her father an independent, was elected in Aspley; another Labor member, Terry Martin, was elected in Elwick.
5 Murchison MLC Tony Fletcher, Rumney MLC Lin Thorp and Paterson MLC Don Wing faced re-election at the 2005 periodic elections. Independent MLC Fletcher retired and was succeeded by another independent, Ruth Forrest, with Wing and Thorp both re-elected.

Members of Tasmanian parliaments by term
21st-century Australian politicians